Pinkshift is an American rock band formed in Baltimore, Maryland in 2019. The group consists of lead vocalist Ashrita Kumar, guitarist Paul Vallejo, and drummer Myron Houngbedji. They have cited those like Nirvana, Arctic Monkeys, and No Doubt as musical influences.

The band has garnered attention for its ethnically diverse members.

History
In 2018, Kumar and Vallejo met at Johns Hopkins University during a school event. The two wrote demos under the name Sugar Crisis, releasing their first demo song "Mars" in 2019. Looking to start a band, the pair desired to find a drummer. To do this, the pair waited outside the drumming practice room on campus, eventually finding and recruiting Houngbedji. The group, renaming themselves to Pinkshift, performed in events around Johns Hopkins University.

On March 13, 2020, Pinkshift released their premier single "On Thin Ice". However, the band's next single, "i'm gonna tell my therapist on you," released on July 31, 2020, marked the beginning of their rise to fame after the song went viral on Reddit and various punk musicians, like Chris No. 2 from Anti-Flag, showed support for the band. On April 2, 2021, the band released their debut extended play Saccharine to strong reviews from critics. These reviews convinced the band members to pursue a career in music, over continuing higher education. On December 31, 2021, the band announced on Twitter that Weinroth was removed from the band's lineup due to cultural and musical differences.

Their debut album, "Love Me Forever", was released on October 21, 2022 via Hopeless Records. The record received positive reviews from critics, who noted how the album was "sharp, and bristling with infectious energy".

Musical style
Kerrang! has described Pinkshift's sound as "blending pop-punk with elements of grunge and alt rock", with "whispers of all sorts of rock and punk influences".

Discography

Studio albums 

 Love Me Forever (2022)

Extended Plays
Saccharine (2021)

Singles
"On Thin Ice" (2020)
"i'm gonna tell my therapist on you "(2020)
"Rainwalk" (2020)
"nothing (in my head)" (2022)
"i'm not crying you're crying" (2022)
”GET OUT” (2022)
”in a breath” (2022)

References

External links
 

American punk rock groups
Rock music groups